Jahongir Vakhidov (born 1995) is an Uzbekistani chess player who holds the title of Grandmaster, which he was awarded in 2014.

Vakhidov was joint winner of the Hastings International Chess Congress in 2013/14 and 2015/16. He also qualified for the Chess World Cup 2017, where he was defeated in the first round by Peter Svidler.

He qualified again for the Chess World Cup 2021 where, ranked 137th, he defeated Levan Pantsulaia 1.5/0.5 in the first round, and ninth seed Leinier Domínguez Pérez 3-1 in the second round, before being defeated by Pavel Ponkratov in the third round.

In the 2022 Chess Olympiad, Vakhidov defeated Max Warmerdam on Board 4 in the decisive game of the final round, tipping the outcome of the match in favour of Uzbekistan and allowing them to emerge victorious in the Olympiad.

References

External links

Jahongir Vakhidov chess games at 365Chess.com

Living people
Chess grandmasters
Uzbekistani chess players
Chess Olympiad competitors
1995 births